Justice Atkinson may refer to:

S. R. Atkinson, associate justice of the Supreme Court of Georgia
Samuel C. Atkinson, associate justice of the Supreme Court of Georgia
William D. Atkinson, associate justice of the Kansas Supreme Court
William King Atkinson, associate justice of the New Hampshire Supreme Court
William Yates Atkinson Jr., associate justice of the Supreme Court of Georgia